Can You Hear Me Now is the fourteenth studio album by the American country music band Sawyer Brown. It was released in 2002 on Curb Records. The album's singles all failed to make Top 40 on the Hot Country Songs charts: "Circles" reached #45, the title track peaked at #47, and "I Need a Girlfriend" failed to chart. After the release of this album, the band recorded three new tracks for a religious-themed compilation, then left Curb for Lyric Street Records, where they released the #48-peaking "I'll Be Around" but no album. They would return to Curb in 2005 for the release of their fifteenth album, 2005's Mission Temple Fireworks Stand.

Track listing
"Can You Hear Me Now" (Mark Miller, Dave Loggins) – 3:41
"I Need a Girlfriend" (Miller, Loggins) – 3:45
"Circles" (Loggins, Marv Green) – 3:33
"Where Was I" (Billy Maddox, Paul Thorn, Anne Graham) – 3:53
"Hard Hard World" (Jamie Hartford) – 2:54
"She's an I've Got to Have You Girl" (Miller, Loggins) – 3:53
"Where the Sun Don't Always Shine" (Miller, Gregg Hubbard) – 2:54
"Someone" (Bill LaBounty, Rick Chudacoff) – 4:01
"Come Back Baby" (Miller) – 3:35
"I Got a Plan" (Miller, Loggins) – 5:35

Personnel 
Sawyer Brown
 Mark Miller – lead vocals
 Gregg "Hobie" Hubbard – keyboards, backing vocals
 Duncan Cameron – lead guitars, backing vocals
 Jim Scholten – bass
 Joe "Curley" Smyth – drums

Additional musicians
 Bernie Herms – keyboards, acoustic piano
 Blair Masters – keyboards
 Brian Tankersley – keyboards
 Joe Erkman – acoustic guitar
 Dale Oliver – electric guitar
 Pete Stewart – electric guitar
 Bobby Terry – acoustic guitar
 Paul Leim – drums, percussion
 Jimmy Myers – percussion
 Larry Franklin – fiddle
 Terry McMillan – harmonica
 Dave Loggins – backing vocals

Production 
 Mark A. Miller – producer 
 Brian Tankersley – producer, recording, mixing 
 Julian King – mixing 
 Jake Burns – recording assistant, mix assistant 
 Richard Hanson – recording assistant, mix assistant 
 Sam Hewitt – recording assistant, mix assistant 
 Hank Williams – mastering at MasterMix (Nashville, Tennessee)
 Glenn Sweitzer – art direction, design 
 Russ Harrington – photography 
 Claudia Fowler – wardrobe 
 Melissa Schleicher – hair stylist, make-up

Chart performance

References

2002 albums
Curb Records albums
Sawyer Brown albums